Christmas Christmas is a Christmas album and the nineteenth studio album by American rock band Cheap Trick. It was released on October 20, 2017.

Track listing

Personnel
 Robin Zander – lead vocals, guitar
 Rick Nielsen – lead guitar, background vocals
 Tom Petersson – bass, background vocals
 Daxx Nielsen – drums

Charts

References

2017 Christmas albums
Cheap Trick albums
Big Machine Records albums
Christmas albums by American artists
Rock Christmas albums
Albums produced by Julian Raymond